The Language Council of Norway is the administrative body of the Norwegian state on language issues. It was established in 2005 and replaced the Norwegian Language Council which existed from 1974 to 2005. It is a subsidiary agency of the Ministry of Culture and has thirty-five employees. It is one of two organisations involved in language standardization in Norway, alongside the Norwegian Academy.

History

Norwegian Language Council
The Norwegian Language Council (1974–2005) had 38 members, which represented different stakeholders, such as other language organisations including the Norwegian Academy, Riksmålsforbundet and Noregs Mållag, but also the educational sector and the media. The council created lists of acceptable word forms. Some words previously had two forms, the official form which were to be used in government documents and textbooks, and optional forms, which could be used by students in state schools. However, after 2005 this difference no longer exists in the lists published by the Language Council of Norway.

References

Further reading 
 The Language Council of Norway, an article online in English at Språkrådet

External links 
Språkrådet

Norwegian language
Languages of Norway
Language regulators
Government agencies of Norway
1972 establishments in Norway
2004 disestablishments in Norway
Language organisations of Norway